Saint-Lubin-des-Joncherets is a commune in the Eure-et-Loir department in northern France. It is located close to the Avre river and the border with the Eure department.

Population

See also
Communes of the Eure-et-Loir department

References

Communes of Eure-et-Loir